This is the list of awards and nominations for the TV series True Blood.

By Awards

American Cinema Editors

American Film Institute Awards

Art Directors Guild

BMI Awards

Bravo A-List Awards

ASTRA Awards

British Academy Television Awards

Costume Designers Guild

Emmy Awards

Ewwy Awards

Genesis Awards

GLAAD Media Awards

Golden Globe Awards

Grammy Awards

Hollywood Music in Media Awards

Motion Picture Sound Editors

NAACP Image Awards

NewNowNext Awards

People's Choice Awards

Producers Guild of America Awards

Satellite Awards

Saturn Awards

Scream Awards

Screen Actors Guild Awards

Shorty Awards

Teen Choice Awards

TCA Awards

Tubey Awards

TV.com Awards

TV DVD Awards

Writers Guild of America Awards

References

True Blood
True Blood